1918 (also known as Horton Foote's 1918) is a 1985 American drama film directed by Ken Harrison and starring William Converse-Roberts, Hallie Foote, and Matthew Broderick. It is based on the play 1918 by Horton Foote, who also wrote the screenplay for the film. It was followed by On Valentine's Day.

Plot
It's 1918, the height of United States involvement in World War I: Liberty Bonds are sold, German immigrants are suspected as traitors or saboteurs, young men everywhere succumb to the patriotism and propaganda, and enlist. In a small Texas town, Horace Robedaux feels the pressure. He does not want to leave his young wife Elizabeth and their young child Jenny, but Elizabeth's can't-do-anything-right little brother constantly talks about the war. Elizabeth's stern father, who opposed the marriage initially, now has plans to take care of his daughter and the child, so Horace can fight for his country, but the Spanish flu influenza epidemic sweeping the town (and the U.S.) may change everyone's plans.

Cast 
 William Converse-Roberts as Horace Robedaux
 Hallie Foote as Elizabeth Robedaux 
 Rochelle Oliver as Mrs. Mary Vaughn 
 Michael Higgins as Mr. Vaughn 
 Matthew Broderick as Brother Vaughn
 Jeanne McCarthy as Bessie Stillman  
 Bill McGhee as Sam the Cemetery Worker 
 L.T. Felty as Mr. Thatcher 
 Horton Foote Jr. as Jessie 
 Tom Murrel as Stanley

Production
TBA

Reception

References

External links 

American drama films
1985 drama films
1985 films
Films with screenplays by Horton Foote
Films about influenza outbreaks
Spanish flu in popular culture
Films set in 1918
1980s English-language films
1980s American films